Elizabeth Szokol (born 1995) is an American professional golfer and LPGA Tour member.

Early life, college and amateur career
Szokol grew up in Winnetka, Illinois, a Chicago suburb. An injury-prone athlete, she experienced her first knee surgery at age 12 after playing softball and tennis. The injury downtime helped her discover golf, which she took up at 14. She led her high school team to the 2010 Illinois State Championship. In 2012 she became the Illinois Women's Amateur Champion.

Szokol attended Northwestern University between 2012 and 2014. In her sophomore year she made the Academic All-Big Ten and the Second Team All-Big Ten. At the 2013 Big Ten Championships, she helped the Wildcats tie for first and claim a share of the first Big Ten Conference title in program history. For her junior year she transferred to the University of Virginia and continued excelling, named to the Atlantic Coast Conference Women's Golf All-Academic Team her senior year.

Professional career
Szokol turned professional in 2017 and joined the Symetra Tour. In her rookie season she recorded six top-10 finishes including a runner-up result at the Four Winds Invitational. In 2018, she recorded seven top-10 finishes including her first professional victory at the IOA Invitational, where she finished 4 strokes ahead of Pajaree Anannarukarn in second place. She finished fourth on the Symetra Tour Official Money List to earn membership for the LPGA Tour for the 2019 season.

In her rookie year on the LPGA Tour she made 10 cuts in 20 starts. Her best finish was a tie for sixth at the Aberdeen Standard Investments Ladies Scottish Open. 

In 2021, she recorded three top-10 finishes including a runner-up at the Marathon Classic in Ohio, and 3rd at the Cognizant Founders Cup in New Jersey, after which she rose into the top-100 in the Women's World Golf Rankings for the first time. She finished the season 44th on the LPGA Tour Money List.

Amateur wins
2012 Illinois Women's Amateur Champion
2016 NCAA Stanford Regional

Professional wins (1)

Symetra Tour wins (1)

Results in LPGA majors
Results not in chronological order.

CUT = missed the half-way cut
NT = no tournament
T = tied

References

External links

American female golfers
LPGA Tour golfers
Northwestern Wildcats women's golfers
Virginia Cavaliers women's golfers
Golfers from Chicago
1995 births
Living people